, sometimes romanized as katcharsee, is a form of festive Okinawan folk dance. In Okinawa, it is often a feature of celebrations such as weddings and victory festivities after tegumi wrestling matches and public elections. It is traditionally accompanied by the sanshin and drum, and often punctuated with finger whistling called .

The dance is executed with the hands in the air, palms flat for women and curled (or in fists) for men. The hands alternate pulling and pushing in an up and down elliptical motion, one hand facing outward and up, the other inward and down. The hand movements are difficult to execute without training. The steps are mostly improvised, generally made in a slight bow-legged stance, alternately lifting and lowering the feet to the rhythm.

Songs
 ("A Chinese Ship is Coming"), the most famous
, for courtship

References

External links
Kachāshī demonstration for women, Part 1
Kachāshī demonstration for women, Part 2
Kachāshī demonstration for men

Dances of Japan
Okinawan folk music